Nitzan Gilady (also known as Nitzan Giladi) is an Israeli film director who has written, produced and directed the documentary films In Satmar Custody (2003) and Jerusalem Is Proud to Present (2008) and The Last Enemy and "It runs in the Family" (2010).

His films have received 13 international awards, participated in over 120 international film festivals and broadcast in prestigious TV channels over the world including Sundance Channel and ZDF-ARTE. His TV work includes: Singing to Oblivion - The Story of Miri Aloni, Do Not Call Me Black 2008 and Dark Southern Deal.

The short fiction drama Queens Up directed by Gilady has participated at the international Jerusalem Film Festival and received an Audience Award at Sedicicorto - Forli International film festival.

In 2004, he received a grant for the art of cinema initiated by the Israeli Ministry of Education, Culture and Sport given to outstanding Israeli filmmakers and film professionals.

Gilady is a graduate of  the Academy of Arts "Circle in the Square" in New York and a senior lecturer at The Academy Institute of Holon (for 8 years) in the Visual Communication Department.

The film "Jerusalem Is Proud to Present" - 
Synopsis - 
In the summer of 2006, Jerusalem was to host, for the first time in history, the World Pride events, which were to culminate in a traditional gay pride parade. The planned events stirred turmoil in the politically complex city, with Jewish, Muslim and Christian religious leaders banding together in an uncompromising battle against what they said would “defile the holy city”. On the other side stood the activists of the Open House, Jerusalem’s LGBT community center, who planned the events. Steadfast in the face of the heated and violent anti-gay sentiment, they had to deal with threats to much more than just their right to march…
The film participated at the following film festivals - 
Docaviv (ISRAEL), Outfest (USA), Sheffield (UK), DOCNZ (New Zealand), Festival de Popoli (ITALY), IDFA (Amsterdam), FICCO (Mexico), One World (Prague), Cleveland International Film Festival, Guth Gafa (Ireland), PIFF (Provincetown, US), Banff World Television Film Festival, London Jewish Film Festival, Fresco LGBT Film Festival, Seattle LGBT Film Festival, Washington Jewish film festival, New York Jewish film festival, Chicago LGBT film festival, Atlanta Jewish film festival, Boston LGBT Film Festival.

The film "In Satmar Custody" - Synopsis -
In Satmar Custody reveals the story of the Jaradi’s, a Jewish Yemenite family, one of many that were brought  from Yemen to the US (Monroe, NY) by the Ultra orthodox Satmar Community which operates a propaganda machine against the immigration to Israel.
The story exposes a deep cultural gap between the Yemenite families and the Yiddish Satmar Community that became distractive and tragic to families who have traveled thousands of miles to an entirely different planet of their own, with strange rules, norms, morals and lifestyles.
Still in Yemen, Yemenite Jewish families are brainwashed by skillful missionaries, unable to defend themselves in the eye of this intricate and deceptive operation. The film follows the life of Yahia and Lauza Jaradi who were brought from Yemen into the Satmar Community. It starts on the day that the Jaradi couple received an urgent phone call notifying that their two and a half year old daughter, Hadia, died in a hospital in Paterson, N.J. Through their search for their daughter’s body, they are getting closer and closer to what seems as the very painful truth about her faith.
The film participated at the following film festivals - 
Marseille Documentary Film Festival 2003 / Jerusalem Film Festival 2003 / IDFA 2003 /Golden Gate Competition – San Francisco International Film Festival / Newport Beach International Film Festival / Palm Beach International Film Festival / Input, Barcelona / Munich Documentary Film Festival / Beverly Hills Film Festival / Toronto Jewish Film Festival / Cork, Ireland / Cape Town World Cinema / Pioneer Theater, New York – A theatrical run.

The Film "The Last Enemy" - Synopsis - 
“The Last Enemy” tells the story of a group of nine Palestinian, Israeli and Jordanian actors who work on a play that was written especially for them by the American Playwright Jim Mirioene. It takes a closer look at Achsen, a Palestinian actress, who finds it difficult to fit into the group because of a painful personal experience that she had long repressed.
The film participated at the following film festivals - Leipzig International Documentary and Animated Film Festival • Victorian Independent Film and Video Festival • Mumbai (Bombay) International Documentary and Animation Film Festival • Cine’ma du Re’el • Munich International Documentary Film Festival • Docaviv- The Tel-Aviv International Documentary Film Festival • US International Film And Video festival • Parnu International Documentary and Anthropology Film Festival (Estonia) • The International Festival of New Film (Croatia) • Intercom- The International Communication Film &Video Competition (Chicago) • Hot Springs International Documentary film festival (Arkansas, USA)  • Cork Int’ Film Festival (Ireland) • Oslo international film festival • Brussels Int’ Independent film festival • Ajijc International film festival (Mexico) • The Jewish Film Festival in Copenhagen •The Israeli Film Festival In Paris • The Australian Documart & Doco Conference • 1001The Turkish Documentary Film Festival • The Israeli Film Festival In Berlin (opening film) •The Ethnofilmfest In Berlin • The Motovun Film Festival (Croatia) • Medfilm festival (Roma) chaverimchaverim (Poland) • Baker Peace Conference (Ohio).

Filmography

Director
1999: The Last Enemy (documentary) 
2003: In Satmar Custody (documentary) 
2007: Zugaim dama (TV movie) 
2008: Jerusalem Is Proud to Present (documentary)
2010: "It runs in the Family " (documentary)

Producer
2003: In Satmar Custody 
2008: Jerusalem Is Proud to Present

Actor
1997: Dream Land as Kamael
1999: Shabbat as Yoni  (short)

External links

 http://www.nitzangiladyfilms.com

Israeli film directors
Year of birth missing (living people)
Living people